Walter Anderson Craddock (March 25, 1932 – July 6, 1980) was an American Major League Baseball pitcher.

Craddock attended Syracuse University and signed with the Athletics in 1954. During his three MLB trials, which included five starting pitcher assignments, he lost all seven of his decisions, allowing 68 hits and 40 bases on balls in 61 innings pitched, with 39 strikeouts.  In the minor leagues, however, Craddock won 18 games for the 1957 Buffalo Bisons, tied with Humberto Robinson as the International League's winningest pitcher, and was selected to the IL all-star team.  He retired in 1960.

References

1932 births
1980 deaths
Baseball players from West Virginia
Buffalo Bisons (minor league) players
Columbus Jets players
Havana Sugar Kings players
Kansas City Athletics players
Major League Baseball pitchers
Nashville Vols players
People from Fayette County, West Virginia
Savannah A's players
Seattle Rainiers players
Shreveport Sports players
Syracuse Orangemen baseball players
American expatriate baseball players in Cuba